The 2007 Kent State Golden Flashes football team represented Kent State University during the 2007 NCAA Division I FBS football season. Kent State competed as a member of the Mid-American Conference (MAC), and played their home games at Dix Stadium. The Golden Flashes were led by fourth-year head coach Doug Martin.

Schedule

References

Kent State
Kent State Golden Flashes football seasons
Kent State Golden Flashes football